Pierre Pujo (19 November 1929 in Boulogne-Billancourt – 10 November 2007) was the leader of the leading French monarchist group Action Française until his death on 10 November 2007.  He was the son of Maurice Pujo.

Under Pierre Pujo's leadership the former mass movement Action Française became a monarchist and anti-European Union "Centre royaliste d'Action Française", publishing a magazine called Action Française 2000. It developed a student movement, called Action Française Etudiante.

Works
 Aspects de la Vie Politique (4 vols., 1968).
 La Droite Nationale et Nous (1969).
 Actualité de la Monarchie (1974).
 Mayotte 79. La France dans l'Océan Indien (1979).
 L'Action Française et la Maison de France (1987).
 La Monarchie aujourd'hui (1988).
 Postface to a new edition of Maurice Pujo's Les Camelots du Roi (1989).
 Mayotte la Française (1993).
 Preface to François Marie Algoud's France, Notre Seule Patrie (2001).
 Un Demi-siècle d'Action Française, 1944-1999 (1999).
 L'Autre Résistance: L'Action Française sous l'Occupation (2004).

References

External links
 Portrait of Pierre Pujo

1929 births
2007 deaths
People from Boulogne-Billancourt
People affiliated with Action Française